Alexandr Ivanovich Gurov (Militsiya Lt. Gen., Professor) (born November 17, 1945 in Tambov Oblast; died december 25, 2021 in Moscow) is a Russian politician and previously a Soviet police detective in the 1980s who made his name researching Soviet organized crime and commenting on it for the media.

In 1999, he co-founded the pro-government Unity Party of Russia. Since 1999, Gurov has been a member of the State Duma, its Unity and United Russia factions, and Committee for Security.

External links
 Russia: Corruption Scandal Could Shake Kremlin by Victor Yasmann. Radio Free Europe/Radio Liberty, September 26, 2006.
 Official page

1945 births
Living people
Soviet police officers
Third convocation members of the State Duma (Russian Federation)
Fourth convocation members of the State Duma (Russian Federation)
Fifth convocation members of the State Duma (Russian Federation)